Glendairy Prison, also called Her Majesty's Prison, was the correctional facility located in the country of Barbados. The prison, which housed up to 1,000 male and female inmates, was located in Station Hill, St. Michael.

History
The prison was built in 1855 before being destroyed in a prison uprising on 29–30 March 2005. The replacement for Glendairy, known as HMP Dodds was opened on 15 October 2007 at Dodds, St. Philip.

A Commission of Inquiry has been set up to aid in an investigation of events which led to the riot and resulting fire.

Proposed alternate uses for the property have included: a rehabilitation centre for ex-offenders, halfway housing for persons addicted to drugs, or housing of individuals with a known mental illness.

Controversies involving the prison
Conprison art 
Prison art Barbados

In popular culture
Scenes of Glendairy Prison were featured in season six of the television show Locked Up Abroad. Documentaries and books have also been written by British prisoners at the new prison including Will Mellor and Terence Donaldson, who wrote Hell in Barbados.

Further reading

See also
Barbados Police Service (BPS)

References

External links

Defunct prisons in Barbados
Military of Barbados
Saint Michael, Barbados